Nahanni Fontaine (born 1971) is a Canadian provincial politician, who was elected as the Member of the Legislative Assembly of Manitoba for the riding of St. Johns in the 2016 and 2019 elections. She held the seat for the NDP after incumbent MLA Gord Mackintosh did not seek re-election.

Fontaine was interviewed for the Tina Fontaine episode the Aboriginal Peoples Television Network documentary series on Missing and Murdered Indigenous Women, Taken. Despite sharing the same surname, the two are not related.

On March 10, 2021, Nahanni Fontaine was removed from the House for the rest of the day for saying the Progressive Conservatives "just don't give a crap" about missing and murdered Indigenous women, girls, and two-spirit people.

Early life
Fontaine was born in Winnipeg, Manitoba and was raised in Point Douglas. She graduated from the University of Winnipeg with a Bachelor of Arts degree in environmental development, and a Master of Arts in native studies.

Personal life
She is the niece of musician Vince Fontaine.

Awards 

 Governor General's Award in Commemoration of the Persons Case (2013)

Electoral record

References

Living people
New Democratic Party of Manitoba MLAs
Politicians from Winnipeg
Women MLAs in Manitoba
First Nations women in politics
21st-century Canadian politicians
21st-century Canadian women politicians
1971 births
First Nations politicians
Governor General's Award in Commemoration of the Persons Case winners